Philip Martin Dunne (born 14 August 1958) is a British politician who has served as the Member of Parliament (MP) for the Ludlow constituency in Shropshire since the 2005 general election. He is a member of the Conservative Party.

He has been a farmer since 1987, at his family's farm just over the county boundary in Herefordshire, at Leintwardine near Ludlow. He was elected in 2001 as a councillor on the South Shropshire District Council, of which he was the Conservative leader in 2003–2005. He was also secretary of the Ludlow Conservative Association for a year in 2001.

Dunne served as Parliamentary Under-Secretary of State for Defence Procurement from 2012 to 2016 and as Minister of State for Health from 2016 to 2018.

Early life

Philip Dunne was born in Ludlow, Shropshire, and has an ancestry of politicians and courtiers. He is the son of Sir Thomas Dunne KG, the former Lord Lieutenant of Herefordshire and Worcestershire, who in turn is the son of Philip Russell Rendel Dunne, who in turn was the son of Edward Marten Dunne. Philip Dunne was educated at Abberley Hall School, followed by Eton College and Keble College, Oxford, where he was awarded a degree in Philosophy, Politics and Economics. At Oxford he was part of the Bullingdon Club.

Interviewed in 2005, Dunne said that he had taken no part in student politics at Oxford, but his tutors Paul Hayes and Larry Siedentop had influenced him by drawing international political themes to his attention.

Political career
He was elected to the House of Commons at the 2005 general election for Ludlow when he unseated the incumbent Liberal Democrat MP, Matthew Green. Dunne regained the (historically safe) seat for the Conservatives; the seat having been lost at the 2001 general election. He made his maiden speech on 8 June 2005. During his first term in Parliament (2005–2010) he was a member of the Work and Pensions Select committee, and in 2006 he was appointed to the Public Accounts Committee.

Philip Dunne held the Ludlow constituency seat in the 2010 general election with a notable swing from the Liberal Democrats, giving Dunne a 52.8 per cent share of the vote and a new, strengthened majority of 9,749. In the 2015 general election Dunne again increased his share of the vote and substantially increased his majority.

In July 2016, he was appointed as Minister for State for Health. In Prime Minister Theresa May's January 2018 reshuffle, he was dismissed from his ministerial post. Before losing his post, Dunne was accused of belittling the winter NHS bed crisis by suggesting unwell people in accident and emergency departments of hospitals without beds could instead use seats.

Just before the Conservative leadership election of 2005, he balloted his constituents about whom he should vote for in the contest. After this ballot Dunne announced that he would be supporting David Cameron; he was also Chairman of Cameron's campaign in Shropshire.

Following the formation of the Liberal Democrat–Conservative coalition government shortly after the general election, Philip Dunne was appointed as an unpaid assistant government whip in the House of Commons. In September 2012, he was appointed Minister for Defence Equipment, Support and Technology with responsibility for defence procurement and defence exports. In this role, he was the minister responsible for, and one of the backers of, the bill which became the Defence Reform Act 2014. He was appointed to the Privy Council of the United Kingdom in the 2019 New Years Honours List, giving him the honorific title "The Right Honourable".

In the 2019 leadership election, Dunne managed Jeremy Hunt's campaign.

In November 2019, at a hustings held in Church Stretton, Dunne told the Labour candidate, Kuldip Sahota, that he was "talking through his turban".

On 29 January 2020, Dunne was elected as chairman of the Environmental Audit Committee, spearheading the examination of government policies' impact on the environment. In this remit, he proposed a private member's bill aiming at sanctioning water companies "that discharge sewage into Britain's rivers".

Personal life
He is married to Domenica and they have two sons and two daughters. As well as farming, Dunne has worked in banking. He also helped start up Ottakar's bookshop.

In 2009, Dunne's wealth was estimated at £5m.

References

External links
Homepage of Philip Dunne MP

BBC Democracy Live Philip Dunne MP
Guardian Unlimited Politics – Ask Aristotle: Philip Dunne MP
Maiden speech in the House of Commons on 8 June 2005.

Conservative Party (UK) MPs for English constituencies
UK MPs 2005–2010
UK MPs 2010–2015
UK MPs 2015–2017
UK MPs 2017–2019
UK MPs 2019–present
1958 births
Living people
People educated at Eton College
Alumni of Keble College, Oxford
Politicians from Ludlow
Members of the Parliament of the United Kingdom for constituencies in Shropshire
Councillors in Shropshire
Members of the Privy Council of the United Kingdom